Mühlenbach is a town in the district of Ortenau in Baden-Württemberg in Germany.

References

Ortenaukreis